The 1914 Ohio State Buckeyes football team represented Ohio State University as a member of the Western Conference and the Ohio Athletic Conference (OAC) during the 1914 college football season. Led by second-year head coach, John Wilce, the Buckeyes compiled an overall record of 5–2 and outscored opponents 108–55. Ohio State had a record of 2–2 against Western Conference opponents and 3–0 in OAC play.

Schedule

Roster
 Ernie Godfrey

Coaching staff
 John Wilce, head coach, second year

References

Ohio State
Ohio State Buckeyes football seasons
Ohio State Buckeyes football